The Pseudomonas Genome Database is a database of genomic annotations for Pseudomonas genomes.

References

External links
Pseudomonas aeruginosa

Biological databases
Pseudomonadales
Bacteria
Psychrophiles
Gram-negative bacteria